Paraclinus sini, the Flapscale blenny, is a species of labrisomid blenny native to the Pacific coast of Mexico including the Gulf of California.  This species can reach a length of  TL.

References

sini
Fish described in 1952
Taxa named by Clark Hubbs